Leningrad was the lead ship of her class of six destroyer flotilla leaders built for the Soviet Navy during the 1930s, one of the three Project 1 variants. Completed in 1936, the ship was assigned to the Baltic Fleet and played a minor role in the Winter War against Finland in 1939–1940. After the start of Operation Barbarossa, the German invasion of the Soviet Union in June 1941, Leningrad covered minelaying operations, laid mines herself, and provided naval gunfire support to Soviet units. She escorted ships during the evacuation of Tallinn, Estonia, in August and then bombarded German troops during the Siege of Leningrad. The ship was assigned to evacuate Soviet troops from their enclave in Hanko, Finland, in November, but was badly damaged by mines en route and forced to return to Leningrad for repairs. After they were completed, Leningrad resumed shelling German positions and continued to do so until the Leningrad–Novgorod Offensive drove them away from the city in January 1944.

After the war, the ship was modernized in 1951–1954. She became a target ship in 1958 and was renamed TsL-75. The ship was transferred to the Northern Fleet the following year and was disarmed in 1960. She was converted into an accommodation ship that year and was renamed PKZ-16. The hulk was reconverted into a target ship, SM-5, in 1962. The following year the ship was used to test anti-ship missiles and sank afterwards.

Design and description
Their crew numbered 250 officers and sailors in peacetime and 311 in wartime.

As built, the Leningrad-class ships mounted five  B-13 guns in two pairs of superfiring single mounts fore and aft of the superstructure and another mount between the bridge and the forward funnel. The guns were protected by gun shields. Anti-aircraft defense was provided by a pair of  34-K AA guns in single mounts on the aft superstructure and a pair of  21-K AA guns mounted on either side of the bridge as well as four  DK machine guns. They carried eight  torpedo tubes in two rotating quadruple mounts; each tube was provided with a reload. The ships could also carry a maximum of either 68 or 115 mines and 52 depth charges. They were fitted with a set of Arktur hydrophones for anti-submarine detection.

Modifications
In 1943, Leningrad exchanged her two 21-K mounts for four  70-K AA guns, a twin-gun mount for the 34-K known as the 81-K and two twin-gun mounts for ex-German 37 mm SK C/30 AA guns, although these latter guns were later replaced by a pair of 70-K guns. She received a British Type 128 asdic system and was fitted with a Type 291 early-warning radar and an American SF-1 radar. After the war, all of the 76- and 37-millimeter guns were replaced by a dozen water-cooled V-11M versions of the 70-K gun in twin mounts. During the 1950s, the radars were replaced by Top Bow, EWS Top, Plum Jar and Ball End radars and the pole foremast was replaced by a tripod mast to support them.

Construction and career
Leningrad, named after the capital of the former Russian Empire under its new Soviet name, was laid down on 5 November 1932 at Shipyard No. 190 (Zhdanov) in Leningrad as yard number 450 and launched on 17 November 1933. Commissioned on 5 December 1936, she was assigned to the Red Banner Baltic Fleet. After the Winter War began on 30 November, Leningrad and her sister ship  bombarded Finnish coastal defense positions on Saarenpää Island, part of the Beryozovye Islands, on 10 December and again on 30 December–3 January 1940. During these missions she was badly damaged by ice and was under repair until 31 May 1941.

The beginning of Operation Barbarossa on 22 June found Leningrad in Tallinn, Estonia, as part of the 4th Destroyer Division and she was ordered to cover minelaying operations at the entrance to the Gulf of Finland between Hanko and Osmussaar on 23–27 June. On 3 July she helped to lay minefield covering the approached to Tallinn. The ship bombarded German positions around Tallinn on 23–27 August, firing 227 shells from her main guns. The Soviets began evacuating the port on the night of 27/28 August with Leningrad providing covering fire until the early morning. After Minsk was badly damaged by a mine on the 28th, Rear Admiral Y. A. Panteleyev transferred his flag to Leningrad the following day. On 1 and 3 September, Leningrad helped to lay minefields covering the approaches to Kronstadt and Leningrad.

The ship moved to the Leningrad Sea Canal on 17 September to bombard German troops and then steamed to the Leningrad Trade Port. On 22 September, she was slightly damaged by shell splinters and moved to Kanonersky Island. Leningrad was struck by one shell and near-missed by another on 12 October. They damaged fuel and fresh-water tanks and started a small fire by igniting the propellant for a 130 mm round. The ship was repaired at Shipyard No. 196 (Sudomekh).

On 9 November she departed Kronstadt for Hanko as part of the third convoy to evacuate Soviet troops together with the destroyer Stoyky and the minelayer . Bad weather forced them to seek shelter behind Gogland Island on the morning of 11 November, although they were able to resume movement that evening. The explosion disabled both turbines and flooded many of her fuel tanks. The ship was able to get underway again, but was forced to return to Kronstadt, escorted by two minesweepers and the transport . She was repaired in Leningrad where she resumed providing gunfire support; the ship fired a total of 1,081 rounds from her 130 mm guns during 1941.

On 14 May 1942, near misses by artillery shells wounded four crewmen, disabled a searchlight and damaged a torpedo tube. During the Leningrad–Novgorod Offensive that lifted the siege of the city, Leningrad fired 650 shells in support of the attack between 14 and 18 January 1944.

Postwar 
Leningrad continued to serve with the Baltic Fleet postwar and was reclassified as a destroyer on 12 January 1949. She was refitted and modernized between 19 December 1951 and 25 November 1954. After brief service, the destroyer was withdrawn from combat duty and reclassified as the target ship TsL-75 on 18 April 1958. She was assigned to the Northern Fleet on 13 October 1959. The former Leningrad was disarmed on 15 September 1960 and converted into a floating barracks, PKZ-16, then target ship SM-5 on 10 August 1962. She was used to test the new P-35 anti-ship cruise missiles of the guided missile cruiser  in May 1963 while anchored in the Kandalaksha Gulf, and was hit by two missiles, but remained afloat with a slight list. After an unsuccessful attempt to tow her back to Severodinsk, she sank in shallow water east of the island of Sennaya Luda in the Solovetsky Islands.

See also 
 List of ships sunk by missiles

References

Bibliography

Further reading

 

Leningrad-class destroyer leaders
Ships built in the Soviet Union
1933 ships
World War II destroyers of the Soviet Union
Maritime incidents in November 1941
Maritime incidents in 1963
Ships sunk as targets